Mud Creek is a stream in the U.S. state of Tennessee. It is a tributary to the Tennessee River.

Mud Creek was descriptively named.

References

Rivers of Hardin County, Tennessee
Rivers of Tennessee